Desmella is a genus of tephritid  or fruit flies in the family Tephritidae.

Species
Desmella anceps (Loew, 1861)
Desmella clarinetta (Munro, 1939)
Desmella conyzae (Frauenfeld, 1857)
Desmella myiopitoides (Bezzi, 1908)
Desmella rostellata (Séguy, 1941)

References

Tephritinae
Tephritidae genera
Diptera of Africa